Stéphane Borbiconi (born March 22, 1979 in Villerupt, France) is a French football player.

Career 
Borbiconi began his career with FC Metz who was 1999 promoted to the first team and was loaned out in summer 2001 to FC Martigues. After his return from this loan with FC Martigues played for FC Metz from 2002 until 2006 before signed with Manisaspor. On 7 July 2009 FC Metz have signed the French defender from Turkish club Manisaspor on a three-year deal. He was loaned in 2010 to Azerbaijani side FC Baku.

Personal life 
Stéphane's brother Christophe is also a former footballer.

References

External links

1979 births
Living people
French footballers
FC Metz players
FC Martigues players
Manisaspor footballers
Expatriate footballers in Turkey
FC Baku players
French expatriate footballers
Süper Lig players
Ligue 1 players
Ligue 2 players
Association football defenders
French expatriate sportspeople in Azerbaijan
Sportspeople from Meurthe-et-Moselle
Footballers from Grand Est
French expatriate sportspeople in Turkey